"Crosseyed and Painless" is a song by American new wave band Talking Heads. It was released in 1980 in the United States as a promotional single from their fourth studio album, Remain in Light. Although the single failed to reach on the US main chart, it reached to 20 on the US Dance chart to become Talking Heads' highest charting dance single. They chose this song for their second music video, released in 1981.

Song style
The song uses instruments and techniques such as cowbell loops, congas, bells, staccato guitar rhythms, and electronic blips. The rhythm of the song, as well as the use of the congas, add an African feel to the song, which is also apparent in their song "I Zimbra".

Lyrics
The lyrics discuss a paranoid and alienated man who feels he is stressed by his urban surroundings. These lyrics are of common theme for Talking Heads and categorize lead singer David Byrne's writing style. The "rhythmical rant" in "Crosseyed and Painless"—"Facts are simple and facts are straight. Facts are lazy and facts are late."—is influenced by old-school rap, specifically Kurtis Blow's "The Breaks" given to Byrne by Frantz.  The singer is filled with doubt and isn't even sure he can believe facts.  By the end of the song, he expresses his resentment of facts: "Facts don't do what I want them to do / Facts just twist the truth around."

Music video
Instead it featured street dancers (including Stephen "Skeeter Rabbit" Nichols), chosen by David Byrne, and who were said to have chosen their own choreography for the video. The dancers engage in various dance mimes of hustling, knife crime, posing, body popping, solicitation and street fighting. The video mix includes an additional verse not heard on the LP mix of the song.

References

External links 

Talking Heads songs
1980 singles
Songs written by David Byrne
Songs written by Brian Eno
Sire Records singles
Song recordings produced by Brian Eno
Songs written by Jerry Harrison
Songs written by Chris Frantz
Songs written by Tina Weymouth
1980 songs
Music videos directed by Toni Basil